The 2020 World Figure Skating Championships were scheduled to be held in Montreal, Quebec, Canada, from March 16 to March 22, 2020. Figure skaters would have competed for the title of world champion in men's singles, ladies' singles, pairs, and ice dance. This would have been the first time that Montreal hosted the World Figure Skating Championships since 1932. The competition was supposed to determine the entry quotas for each federation at the 2021 World Championships.

The competition was cancelled on March 11 due to concerns about the COVID-19 pandemic, with the possibility of being held later in the year, but not within the current season. It was the second time the event had been cancelled for reasons other than a World War, after the 1961 World Championships were cancelled following the Sabena Flight 548 crash.

The competition was formally cancelled on April 16, after the International Skating Union (ISU) previously considered rescheduling to later within the year. A year later, Skate Canada successfully bid for the right to host the 2024 World Championships in Montreal in lieu of the cancelled earlier event.

Reactions to the COVID-19 pandemic 
After a spike in COVID-19 cases from the ongoing pandemic and the cancellation of the 2020 Women's Ice Hockey World Championships in Nova Scotia by the International Ice Hockey Federation, the ISU was placed under intense pressure to make a public statement on the status of the 2020 World Figure Skating Championships, as the disease rapidly intensified across the world. The ISU had implemented prevention methods at its events since February 4, 2020 and required all attendees seeking accreditation to complete a questionnaire and temperature check.

Skate Canada, the host federation, issued a statement on Friday, March 6, that all athletes would be screened for symptoms at the border, undergo health checks, and be required to fill out questionnaires throughout the competition. On Tuesday, March 10, media, officials, skaters, and coaches scheduled to attend the event received a lengthy Coronavirus Information Package from the ISU. All individuals attending the event would have been required to undergo a temperature check upon arrival to the competition and would have been required to check in under . The Quebec Health Ministry held a press conference the same day to discuss "all major events in the province...with input from the Public Health Agency of Canada." At the meeting, Quebec Minister of Health Danielle McCann indicated that cancellation was a possibility, but a final decision had not yet been reached, despite athletes being scheduled to arrive within the next few days.

At 3:30 PM EDT on Wednesday, March 11, the Quebec government and Quebec Health Ministry made the decision to cancel the World Championships. The ISU posted a statement agreeing with the decision, saying that the event could possibly be rescheduled for later in the year, but not before October 2020. It was unclear how the cancellation would affect the upcoming season and its subsequent Grand Prix assignments, which will begin before then.

On April 12, 2020, ISU Vice-President for Figure Skating, Alexander Lakernik, told media that the chances of rescheduling the championship were slim, due to the ongoing pandemic. The ISU confirmed a complete cancellation of the event, with no chance of postponement to a later date, on April 16.

ISU member nations' response 
Prior to the cancellation announcement on March 11, the Polish Figure Skating Association asked its athletes on March 10 to make personal decisions by the next day, March 11, on whether or not to attend the event, following the Polish Minister of Sport's recommendation to avoid travel to foreign events.

Skate Canada, the host federation, postponed several conference calls with its skaters from March 11 to March 13, while awaiting a decision by the local Quebec government on the status of the event.

Several prominent skaters, including two-time reigning men's World Champion Nathan Chen, and coaches Rafael Arutyunyan, Lee Barkell, Marie-France Dubreuil, and Brian Orser, expressed concerns over the possibility of rescheduling the competition to fall 2020, citing the disruption to their training schedules and the proximity to the 2021 edition of the event.

Qualification

Age and minimum TES requirements
Skaters are eligible for the 2020 World Championships if they turned 15 years of age before July 1, 2019 and have met the minimum technical elements score requirements. The ISU accepts scores if they were obtained at senior-level ISU-recognized international competitions at least 21 days before the first official practice day of the championships. The ISU raised the minimum for ladies' singles in both segments on January 8, 2020.

Number of entries per discipline 
Based on the results of the 2019 World Championships, each ISU member nation can field one to three entries per discipline.

Schedule

Entries 
Member nations began announcing their selections in December 2019. The International Skating Union published a complete list of entries on February 26, 2020.

Changes to preliminary entries

References 

World Figure Skating Championships
World Figure Skating Championships
World Figure Skating Championships
International figure skating competitions hosted by Canada
World Figure Skating Championships
Figure skating events cancelled due to the COVID-19 pandemic